Maximilian Henry, Count of Wied-Runkel (1 May 1681 – 19 December 1706) was a German nobleman.  He was the ruling Count of Wied-Runkel from 1692 until his death.

Life 
He was a son of George Herman of Wied (1640-1690) and his second wife Johanna Elisabeth of Leiningen-Westerburg (1659-1708).  He was the founder of the younger Wied-Runkel line.

On 27 August 1692, he received the Upper part of the County of Wied from his paternal grandfather Frederick the Elder, initially under guardianship.  His part of the county included Altwied Castle, the village of Isenburg, the parish of Maysheid and the Lordship of Meud (which had previously been part of Lower Wied).

He served in the army of Landgrave Ernest Louis of Hesse-Darmstadt, where he climbed to the rank of Rittmeister.

He was killed in a duel on 19 December 1706.  His underage son John Louis Adolph succeeded him as Count of Wied-Runkel.

Marriage and issue 
On 29 August 1704 in Detmold, he married Sophia Florentina (8 September 1683 – 23 April 1758), a daughter of Count Simon Henry of Lippe-Detmold.  Together, they had two sons:
 John Louis Adolph (30 May 1705 – 18 May 1762)
 Charles William Emil Alexander (19 June 1706 – 30 November 1771)

External links 
 Genealogy at dilibri.de

Footnotes 

Counts of Wied
House of Wied
1681 births
1706 deaths
17th-century German people
18th-century German people